The 1996 African Women's Handball Championship was the twelfth edition of the African Women's Handball Championship, held in Benin from 16 to 29 October 1996. It acted as the African qualifying tournament for the 1997 World Women's Handball Championship.

Preliminary round

Group A

Group B

Knockout stage

Places 5–7

Bracket

Semifinals

Third place game

Final

Final ranking

External links
Results on todor66.com

1996 Women
African Women's Handball Championship
1996 in African handball
Hand
International sports competitions hosted by Benin
Women's handball in Benin
October 1996 sports events in Africa
1996 in African women's sport